Turkey participated in the Eurovision Song Contest 2004 with the song "For Real" written by Gökhan Özoğuz and Hakan Özoğuz. The song was performed by Athena. In addition to participating in the contest, the Turkish broadcaster Türkiye Radyo ve Televizyon Kurumu (TRT) also hosted the Eurovision Song Contest at the Abdi İpekçi Arena in Istanbul after winning the competition in 2003 with the song "Everyway That I Can" performed by Sertab Erener.

Before Eurovision

Artist selection 
On 2 September 2003, TRT announced that the band Athena had been internally selected to represent Turkey in Istanbul. It was also announced that a national final would be held to select the song they would perform at the contest.

26. Eurovision Şarkı Yarışması Türkiye Finali 
Three songs, all written by members of Athena Gökhan Özoğuz and Hakan Özoğuz, were submitted to the broadcaster and presented on TRT International between 21 and 24 January 2004 for the public to vote for their favourite song via telephone and SMS voting. The winning song, "For Real", was announced on 24 January during the TRT 1 programme Sayısal Gece, hosted by Isik Özden and Ziya Kürküt.

At Eurovision
As the winner of the Eurovision Song Contest 2003 and host of the 2004 Contest, Turkey automatically qualified for a place in the final. On the night of the final, group performed 22nd in the running order, following Cyprus and preceding Romania. The song was such a success at the Eurovision Song Contest 2004 that it became 4th with 195 points, meaning that Turkey automatically qualified for the final in the 2005 contest.

Voting

Points awarded to Turkey

Points awarded by Turkey

References

2004
Countries in the Eurovision Song Contest 2004
Eurovision